Sarah Rae-Ann Root (May 1, 1994 – January 31, 2016) was an American woman who was killed by a drunk driver. The driver, Eswin Mejia, was an illegal immigrant and was placed on the ICE Most Wanted List. His blood alcohol content was 0.241, three times the legal limit. Sarah's mother Michelle became an advocate for changing the law on illegal immigrants.

In his presidential acceptance speech, Donald Trump attacked the Obama administration's immigration policy, referencing Root as being "just one more American life that wasn't worth protecting" and "one more child to sacrifice on the altar of open borders".

Sarah's Law 
After her death, her mother brought the matter to Iowa Senators Charles Grassley and Joni Ernst and Nebraska Senators Deb Fisher and Ben Sasse for the implementation of Sarah's Law.
The law would require "U.S. Immigration and Customs Enforcement to take into custody certain aliens who have been charged in the United States with a crime that resulted in the death or serious bodily injury of another person" As of 2020, the bill has not passed into law, although portions were implemented in a 2017 executive order by Trump directing the Secretary of Homeland Security to prioritize the removal of violent criminals.

References

1994 births
2016 deaths
Road incident deaths in Nebraska
Place of birth missing
Illegal immigration to the United States